Derek Williams (28 January 1937 – January 2015) was an English professional footballer who played as an inside forward in the Football League for Grimsby Town and Bradford Park Avenue.

References

1937 births
2015 deaths
People from the Metropolitan Borough of Gateshead
Footballers from Tyne and Wear
English footballers
Association football inside forwards
Doncaster YMCA F.C. players
Doncaster Rovers F.C. players
Sheffield Wednesday F.C. players
Grimsby Town F.C. players
Bradford (Park Avenue) A.F.C. players
Skegness Town A.F.C. players
English Football League players